Othmar Schmalz (27 August 1903 – 6 November 1966) was a Swiss water polo player. He competed in the men's tournament at the 1928 Summer Olympics.

References

External links
 

1903 births
1966 deaths
Swiss male water polo players
Olympic water polo players of Switzerland
Water polo players at the 1928 Summer Olympics
Sportspeople from the canton of St. Gallen